The 5th Asian Table Tennis Championships 1980 were held in Calcutta, India, from 10 to 18 May 1980. It was organised by the Table Tennis Federation of India under the authority of Asian Table Tennis Union (ATTU) and International Table Tennis Federation (ITTF).

Medal summary

Medal table

Events

See also
World Table Tennis Championships
Asian Cup

References

Asian Table Tennis Championships
Asian Table Tennis Championships
Table Tennis Championships
Table tennis competitions in India
Asian Table Tennis Championships
Asian Table Tennis Championships